The 2018 Pakistan Super League (also known as PSL 3 or for sponsorship reasons, HBL PSL 2018) was the third season of the Pakistan Super League, a franchise Twenty20 cricket league which was established by the Pakistan Cricket Board in 2015. It featured six teams, which was the first expansion of the league since its formation in 2015. The group stage took place in the United Arab Emirates, with two playoff matches played in Lahore and the final at the National Stadium, Karachi. The tickets for the final were sold out quickly, within fifteen hours.

In the final match, the inaugural champions Islamabad United defeated the defending champions Peshawar Zalmi by three wickets in Karachi to win the title for a second time. Luke Ronchi of Islamabad United was named the Man of the Match of the Final, as well as the player of the tournament and also the leading run scorer, scoring 435 runs in the tournament. Faheem Ashraf of Islamabad United was awarded the best bowler award; as both he and Wahab Riaz of Peshawar Zalmi took 18 wickets to lead the wicket-takers list.

Background
After the success of holding the previous tournament's final at the Gaddafi Stadium, the PCB decided to play eight games of PSL 3 in Pakistan. In addition the PCB chairman Najam Sethi confirmed there would be a sixth team being added in the 2018 edition, with the idea having previously been rejected in 2017. There was much interest in what the sixth team would be, with the PCB shortlisting Hyderabad, Dera Murad Jamali, FATA, Faisalabad and Multan. In the end, the winning party was Multan with Schön Properties paying $5.2 million a year.

Ceremonies

Opening ceremony
In the opening ceremony, which was hosted in Dubai, American pop singer Jason Derulo featured alongside Pakistani singers including Abida Parveen, Ali Zafar and Shehzad Roy. Hareem Farooq and Bilal Ashraf hosted the ceremony. The ceremony also featured the Pakistani Sachal Orchestra and a firework display, with a teaser of Zafar's first Pakistani film Teefa in Trouble also being shown.

Closing ceremony
The Closing ceremony took place at National Stadium, Karachi, on 25 March ahead of the final. The ceremony was hosted by Bilal Ashraf, with Pakistani singers Ali Zafar, Shehzad Roy, Strings, Aima Baig and Farhan Saeed performing live in front of 33,000 people in the stadium.

Teams and squads

The 2018 PSL featured six team franchises, with five teams that appeared in previous seasons; and a new team based in Multan.

The player draft for the 2018 season was held in Lahore on 12 November 2017. 501 players, including both Pakistani and international players, were divided into five different categories. Each franchise was allowed to pick a maximum of seven foreign players in their squads, which could have a maximum of 21 members.

Officials
The panel of officials for the tournament consisted of eight umpires and two match referees. Aleem Dar, Ranmore Martinesz and Tim Robinson stood in matches during the tournament. Pakistani umpires Ahmed Shahab, Shozab Raza, Rashid Riaz, Khalid Mehmood and Asif Yaqoob were also part of the panel as well. The match referees panel consisted of former Sri Lankan ICC match referee Roshan Mahanama and Pakistani match referee Mohammad Anees.

Venues
Like the 2016 and 2017 seasons, most of the matches of 2018 season were played in the UAE. However, the playoffs and final took place in Pakistan; they were played in Lahore and Karachi. Each foreign cricketer who played matches in the country was paid an extra  for each of these matches.

The International Cricket Council security team visited National Stadium, Karachi, on 23 October, to ensure its condition. The  chairman of the PCB Najam Sethi was quoted on 22 November saying "that the renovation of stadium will be completed in February 2018, to host the PSL Final." The tickets for the final were sold out within 3 hours.

Promotion in media
The league was promoted on social media by the hashtag #HBLPSL 2018, due to its three-year contract (2016–18) with HBL Pakistan for title sponsorship. Also, the six teams are promoted by #AbKhel6Ka. It was also promoted by #DilSeJaanLagaDe, the hashtag for the league's official anthem by Ali Zafar.

Season standings

Points table 

Notes:
 C = Champions; 
 R = Runner-up;
 (x) = Position at the end of the tournament;

League stage
The league stage of the tournament ran from 22 February to 16 March 2018.

Summary

Week 1
The month long tournament began on 22 February between the defending champions, Peshawar Zalmi and the new team the Multan Sultans. Peshawar batted first and, despite losing a wicket in the second over, went on to score 151/6 with Mohammed Hafeez top-scoring with 59 runs. The Sultans chased the score down, losing just 3 wickets, giving them a 7 wicket win, and winning on their PSL debut. The first double-header of the group stage saw wins for Karachi and Multan by 19 and 43 runs respectively. The Multan win brought up an interesting stat which was that both of the first two PSL hat tricks took place in Dubai, on a Friday, under Shoaib Malik's captaincy, against the Lahore Qalandars.  The next four games were all one-sided; in the first the defending champions Peshawar restricted Islamabad to 149/9 from Islamabad's 20 overs, to get their first win of the tournament with Umaid Asif taking a 4-fer (4 wicket haul) on debut for Zalmi. On the same day, the Quetta Gladiators quickly chased down 119 inside 14 overs against the Lahore Qalandars. In the sixth game, the Multan Sultans' winning run came to an end against Islamabad United. In the game, the Sultans were all out for 113 with United winning by 5 wickets. In the next game despite Dwayne Smith's 71 not out, the Karachi Kings chased down 131 to beat Peshawar by 5 wickets. At Dubai, the rivals Lahore and Karachi faced off, Lahore's poor form continued as they lost their third consecutive game in the tournament with Karachi winning by 27 runs and Shahid Afridi taking 3-19. In the final game of week 1, which was the first game of the tournament in Sharjah, the Gladiators won comfortably by 6 wickets against Islamabad.

Week 2
The second week began dramatically, with Peshawar having a batting collapse to fall to 125/5 in their innings against the Quetta Gladiators in Sharjah. In next the Zalmi captain Daren Sammy, who was earlier taken off with an injury, came out and hit two sixes and a four to get Zalmi a win. After game 11 between Multan and Karachi in Sharjah was abandoned at the toss, the other game on the day was also hosted at Sharjah.  The game between Lahore and Islamabad was the first in PSL history at that point, to finish with a super over as both teams were tied on 121. In Lahore's over they finished with 15/1, while in Islamabad's over they got 19 winning the game with a last ball 6. The game after was more straightforward, with an Imran Tahir hat-trick downing Quetta and giving Multan the win. The game after made history as the first ever 10 wicket win in the PSL, as Peshawar Zalmi chased down 101 without losing a wicket. The next day, Islamabad United beat Karachi Kings by 8 wickets with help from a Luke Ronchi 71. On the same day, a Sohaib Maqsood* carried the Multan Sultans' to another win against Peshawar Zalmi, this time by 19 runs. The day after Umar Gul rolled back the years taking 6/24 for the Multan Sultans', but the effort was in vain as the then Pakistan under 19 captain Hasan Khan hit a last over 6 to give Quetta a 2 wicket win. The last day of week 2 saw a double-header, with both games being played at Dubai. In the first game a Luke Ronchi 77 helped Islamabad beat Lahore by 6 wickets, while in the second game Quetta beat Karachi by 67 runs. This was at the time the biggest win by runs in PSL history.

Week 3
Week 3 started with a Lahore win, as future Pakistan international Shaheen Shah Afridi took 5/4 in his 3.4 overs against the Multan Sultans. In game 21 despite 3/30 and 33 not out from Wahab Riaz, Islamabad United beat Peshawar Zalmi by 26 runs taking Islamabad to the top of the table. The day after was a double header, with a Joe Denly 78 from 55 balls helping the Karachi Kings to a comfortable win over Multan by 63 runs. The second game of the day involved Peshawar and Quetta, with a Sarfaraz Ahmed 45* guiding Quetta home with 6 wickets to spare and eliminating Lahore in the process. A super over was needed again to separate Lahore and Karachi with them both being tied 163 after both of their 20 overs, in the end though Sunil Narine held his nerve to give Lahore their second win of the season. A crucial encounter followed 2 days later, with Islamabad and Multan facing off at Sharjah Cricket Stadium. In the end though despite 73 of 47 from Kieron Pollard, Islamabad won by 33 runs meaning that they and Quetta both advanced to the playoffs. In game 26, Lahore continued their winning run against Quetta thanks to 94 of 50 from Fakhar Zaman. The next day, Peshawar beat Karachi helped by 75 by Kamran Akmal and 3/17 from Liam Dawson keeping Peshawar in the tournament. Islamabad continued their winning run in game 28, ensuring that they finished at the top of the table by beating Quetta by 6 wickets.

Week 4
Week 4 only consisted of two games as the tournament moved from the League stage to the knockouts, in the penultimate game the Lahore Qalandars scored 172 in their innings against Peshawar. In response Kamran Akmal scored his 2nd century in the PSL becoming the first player to score two centuries in the history of the tournament, and guiding Peshawar into the playoffs with a win. While in the final game taking place on the same day Islamabad United collapsed to 121, allowing the Karachi Kings to claim a playoff spot and eliminate the Multan Sultans in the process.

Table of results

League progression

Fixtures

Playoffs

Preliminary

Qualifier 1

The qualifiers meant the top two teams on the table, Karachi and Islamabad, would face off. Karachi Kings won the toss and chose to bat first. One of the openers Khurram Manzoor, got out early while the other Joe Denly got his half century before getting out hit-wicket. Their number 3 batsman Babar Azam also got out cheaply as he got out second ball for a silver duck. Next came in Karachi's captain Eoin Morgan who made 21 before being sent back to the pavalion. The top-scorer of the kings innings was Colin Ingram with an unbeaten 61 helping Karachi get to 150. The pick of the bowlers was the former Pakistan international Mohammad Sami with 2-20. In response the game never looked in doubt as a quickfire 94 not out from Luke Ronchi sent Islamabad to the final. Ronchi was well supported by the other opener Sahibzada Farhan who made 29 with Samit Patel hitting the winning runs, to get the fastest victory in terms of balls remaining ever in the PSL at the time.

Eliminator

The eliminator put the teams in 3rd and 4th against each other, with these being Peshawar Zalmi and Quetta Gladiators. The two teams previously played against each other in the year before's final. Quetta Gladiators won the toss and chose to field. The Gladiators dismissed the Zalmi openers quite cheaply with Kamran Akmal out for a duck. Andre Fletcher came in but was soon sent back to the pavilion as well for a single run. Liam Dawson and Mohammed Hafeez steadied the ship for Zalmi with 62 and 25 respectively to help get Peshawar over 150. Rahat Ali was the pick of the bowlers with 4-16. In response both of Quetta's openers fluctuated and were both out cheaply. Afterwards twin 35's from the Gladiators captain Sarfaraz Ahmed and Mohammad Nawaz brought some stability to their innings. Going in to the final over it looked like the game was over for the gladiators who needed 25 off it . However Anwar Ali scored 23 of the first five balls against Liam Dawson meaning Quetta needed 3 off the last ball to win, then a dropped catch followed but Mir Hamza was run out trying to get back for 2 and draw the game. This meant Peshawar Zalmi won by 1 run having previously lost twice to the Quetta by a run. All of Zalmi's bowlers took 2 wickets except Dawson with Hasan Ali and Sameen Gul both taking 2-21

Eliminator 2

The second eliminator put the loser of the qualifier the Karachi Kings against the winner of the first eliminator Peshawar Zalmi."Eliminator 1 Scorecard The game got off to a late start due to rain which meant that both teams innings were reduced to 16 overs. Karachi Kings won the toss and decided to field first. Both of Zalmi's openers got off to a good start with Andre Fletcher making 34 and Kamran Akmal smashing a quick half-century (50 of 17 balls). Zalmi's middle order supported Akmal helping him finish on 77  Zalmi on 170 with Ravi Bopara taking the most wickets with 3-35. In response one of Karachi's openers, Joe Denly scored 79 not out from 46 and he was well supported by Babar Azam who made 63 of 46 before getting out to Hasan Ali in the end though Zalmi won by 13 runs and went through to the final. Sameen Gul was the pick of the bowlers conceding just 20.

Final

The final took place at National Stadium, Karachi, after the semi finals which had taken place in Lahore, with it being the first high-profile match in the stadium in 10 years. Peshawar won the toss an elected to bat, there innings started badly with Kamran Akmal and Andre Flecher getting out cheaply. Mohammed Hafeez came in next but was soon back in the pavilion only scoring 8. Zalmi recovered with Liam Dawson and Chris Jordan both scoring thirties with Jordan scoring 36 and Dawson 33. After they both departed Zalmi's lower middle orde collapsed before a late onslaught from Wahab Riaz got Zalmi close to 150. The pick of the bowlers was Shahdab Khan with 3-25. In response Islamabad got off to a good start with Luke Ronchi and Sahibzada Farhan scoring big. Ronchi got his half-century before getting out on 52, while Farhan scored 44 before losing his wicket. With Islamabad near their target a middle order collapse followed with 5 batsman only contributing 20 runs. However, in the end 3 sixes in a row from Asif Ali got united over the line and gave them their second PSL title.

Awards and statistics

Most runs

  Luke Ronchi of Islamabad United received the Green Cap for scoring the most runs.

Most wickets

  Faheem Ashraf of Islamabad United received the Maroon Cap as he took the most wickets.

See also
Multan Sultans in 2018
Peshawar Zalmi in 2018

Notes

References

External links

 
2018 in Emirati cricket
Super League
Super League
2018 in Sindh
2010s in Dubai
2010s in Karachi
2010s in Lahore
Cricket in Karachi
Cricket in Lahore
February 2018 sports events in Pakistan
History of the Emirate of Sharjah
March 2018 sports events in Pakistan
Sport in Dubai
Sport in Sharjah (city)